This is a list of diplomatic missions of Colombia 

Colombia currently has 64 embassies. Honorary consulates and the overseas offices of ProColombia are excluded from this listing.

Current missions

Africa

Americas

Asia

Europe

Oceania

Multilateral organizations

Gallery

Closed missions

Africa

Americas

Asia

Europe

See also
Foreign relations of Colombia
List of diplomatic missions in Colombia
Visa policy of Colombia

Notes

References

External links

 Colombian Ministry of Foreign Affairs

 
Diplomatic missions
Colombia